The Asia Pacific Poker Tour (APPT) is a major international series of poker tournaments established in 2007 and hosted in cities across the Asia Pacific. Along with other major tours such as the European Poker Tour and Latin American Poker Tour, the Asia Pacific Poker Tour is sponsored by PokerStars.

Format
The first season ran from August to December 2007 with five events held across four locations: Manila (Philippines); Seoul (South Korea); Macau (China); and Sydney (Australia). The second season runs from September to December 2008 with six events held across five locations: Macau (China); Seoul (South Korea); Auckland (New Zealand); Manila (Philippines); and Sydney (Australia). The third season was held with events held in the same locations as 2008, with the substitution of Cebu for Manila in the Philippines. In 2014 the eight season was played.

Since season three, PokerNews.com and PokerStars.tv have provided intensive online reporting, including video coverage by presenters Lynn Gilmartin, Kristy Arnett, Sarah Grant and Nicki Pickering.

The Asia Pacific Poker Tour (APPT) is responsible for bringing the first major government-sanctioned real-money Texas hold 'em poker tournaments to Korea and China. The PokerStars.net APPT Macau: Asian Poker Open in November 2007 was the first-ever poker tournament in Macau. With 352 entrants, it was also the largest poker tournament in Asia (a November 2006 event in Singapore held the previous record with 313 entrants). With 538 entrants APPT Macau 2008 was the largest poker tournament in Asia, however, that record is currently held by 2014 APPT Beijing Millions, which saw a record 2,732 players compete for ¥7,376,400 (US$1,195,647) in prize money. While the 'Millions' tournaments played out under the APPT brand, they are considered separate tournament series from the regular APPT events, as they do not run annually.

The largest APPT Main Event field record was set at the 2018 APPT Manila, which saw Singapore's Wilson Lim defeat a 1,364-strong field to claim the ₱12,970,000 (US$244,815) top prize, with the total prize pool coming in at ₱65,492,460 (US$1,236,204).

Tournament results
All prizes are listed in US dollars.

Season 1

Season 2

Season 3

Season 4

Season 5

Season 6

Season 7

Season 8

Season 9

Season 10

Season 11

Season 12

Season 13

Season 14

Season 15

Winners by country

Up to Season 14 - APPT Cambodia

Seats at Final Tables by country

Up to Season 14 - APPT Cambodia

Top 10 Prizes

Up to Season 14 - APPT Cambodia

See also
Asia Pacific Poker Tour season 1 results
Asia Pacific Poker Tour season 2 results
Asia Pacific Poker Tour season 3 results
Asia Pacific Poker Tour season 4 results

Notes

External links
Official website
Asia Pacific Poker Tour at the Hendon Mob

 
Poker tournaments
Recurring events established in 2007